The Royal Family Order of Saints Olga and Sophia was an order of the Greek royal family. Reserved for women, it was the third highest honour of the modern Greek state and the Crown after the Order of the Redeemer and the male-only Order of Saints George and Constantine. It was instituted in January 1936, by King George II in the memory of his grandmother (Queen Olga) and his mother (Queen Sophia).

The order was abolished in 1973, by the Greek state and today is awarded only by the head of the former Greek royal family.

Grades
 Dame Grand Cross
 Dame Commander
 Commander
 Gold Cross
 Silver Cross

Grand Mistresses
 1936 – 1947: Queen Helen, The Queen Mother of Romania (née Princess Helen of Greece and Denmark)
 1947 – 1964: Queen Frederica (née Princess Frederica of Hanover) 
 1964 – 2023: Queen Anne-Marie (née Princess Anne-Marie of Denmark)
 2023 – present: Crown Princess Marie-Chantal (née Marie-Chantal Miller)

Recipients
Upon the creation of the Order in January 1936, Greek Princesses and their daughters were invested in order of precedence:
 The Queen Mother of Romania (née Princess Helen of Greece and Denmark) – Grand Mistress (1936–1947)
 Princess Irene of Greece and Denmark – Dame Grand Cross, Special Class
 Princess Katherine of Greece and Denmark – Dame Grand Cross, Special Class
 Princess Alexandra of Greece and Denmark – Dame Grand Cross, Special Class
 Grand Duchess Maria Georgievna of Russia (née Princess Maria of Greece and Denmark) – Dame Grand Cross, Special Class
 Princess Alexander of Greece and Denmark (née Aspasia Manos) – Dame Grand Cross, Special Class
 Princess Eugénie of Greece and Denmark – Dame Grand Cross, 1st Class
 Grand Duchess Maria Pavlovna of Russia – Dame Grand Cross, 1st Class
 Princess Paul of Yugoslavia (née Princess Olga of Greece and Denmark) – Dame Grand Cross, 1st Class
 Princess Elizabeth, Countess of Törring-Jettenbach (née Princess Elizabeth of Greece and Denmark) – Dame Grand Cross, 1st Class
 The Duchess of Kent (née Princess Marina of Greece and Denmark) – Dame Grand Cross, 1st Class
 Princess Paul Aleksandrovich Chavchavadze (née Princess Nina Georgievna of Russia) – Dame Grand Cross, 1st Class
 Princess Xenia Georgievna of Russia – Dame Grand Cross, 1st Class
 The Hereditary Princess of Hohenlohe-Langenburg (née Princess Margarita of Greece and Denmark) – Dame Grand Cross, 1st Class
 The Margravine of Baden (née Princess Theodora of Greece and Denmark) – Dame Grand Cross, 1st Class
 The Hereditary Grand Duchess of Hesse and by Rhine (née Princess Cecilie of Greece and Denmark) – Dame Grand Cross, 1st Class
 Princess Sophie of Greece and Denmark - Dame Grand Cross, 1st Class
 Princess George of Greece and Denmark (née Princess Marie Bonaparte) – Dame Grand Cross, 1st Class
 Princess Nicholas of Greece and Denmark (née Grand Duchess Elena Vladimirovna of Russia) – Dame Grand Cross, 1st Class
 Princess Andrew of Greece and Denmark (née Princess Alice of Battenberg) - Dame Grand Cross, 1st Class
 Princess Christopher of Greece and Denmark (née Princess Françoise of Orléans) – Dame Grand Cross, 1st Class
 The Landgravine of Hesse (née Princess Margaret of Prussia) – Dame Grand Cross, 1st Class

Other dames
 Queen Frederica (née Princess Frederica of Hanover) – Grand Mistress (1947–1964)
 The Duchess of Brunswick (née Princess Victoria Louise of Prussia) – Dame Grand Cross, Special Class
 Queen Anne of Romania (née Princess Anne of Bourbon-Parma) – Dame Grand Cross, Special Class
 Queen Mary of United Kingdom (née Princess Mary of Teck) – Dame Grand Cross, Special Class
 Queen Elizabeth of the United Kingdom (née Lady Elizabeth Bowes-Lyon) – Dame Grand Cross, Special Class
 Queen Victoria Eugenie of Spain (née Princess Victoria Eugenie of Battenberg) – Dame Grand Cross, Special Class
 The Countess of Barcelona (née Princess María de las Mercedes of Bourbon-Two Sicilies) – Dame Grand Cross, 1st Class
 Queen Ingrid of Denmark (née Princess Ingrid of Sweden) – Dame Grand Cross, Special Class
 Queen Marie-José of Italy (née Princess Marie José of Belgium) – Dame Grand Cross, Special Class
 Grand Duchess Joséphine-Charlotte of Luxembourg (née Princess Joséphine-Charlotte of Belgium) – Dame Grand Cross, Special Class
 Princess René of Bourbon-Parma (née Princess Margaret of Denmark) – Dame Grand Cross, 1st Class
 Princess Georgina of Liechtenstein (née Countess Georgina of Wilczek) – Dame Grand Cross, Special Class
 The Duchess of Badajoz (née Infanta Pilar of Spain) – Dame Grand Cross

Current dames
 Queen Anne-Marie (née Princess Anne-Marie of Denmark) - Grand Mistress (1964–2023)
 Queen Sofía of Spain (née Princess Sophia of Greece and Denmark) – Dame Grand Cross, Special Class
 Princess Irene of Greece and Denmark - Dame Grand Cross, Special Class
 Princess Beatrix of the Netherlands – Dame Grand Cross, Special Class
 The Queen of Denmark – Dame Grand Cross, Special Class
 Princess Tatiana Radziwiłł - Dame Grand Cross
 The Dowager Princess of Sayn-Wittgenstein-Berleburg (née Princess Benedikte of Denmark) – Dame Grand Cross, 1st Class
 The Custodian of the Crown of Romania – Dame Grand Cross, Special Class 
 The Duchess of Soria (née Infanta Margarita of Spain) – Dame Grand Cross
 Princess Alexia, Mrs Carlos Morales (née Princess Alexía of Greece and Denmark) – Dame Grand Cross, Special Class
 Princess Theodora of Greece and Denmark – Dame Grand Cross, Special Class
 Crown Princess Pavlos of Greece (née Marie-Chantal Miller) – Grand Mistress (2023–present)
 Princess Nikolaos of Greece and Denmark (née Tatiana Blatnik) – Dame Grand Cross, 1st Class
 Princess Maria-Olympia of Greece and Denmark – Dame Grand Cross, Special Class
 Princess Philippos of Greece and Denmark (née Nina Nastassja Flohr) – Dame Grand Cross, 1st Class

References

External links 

 The Greek Royal Orders
 The depicted picture is from the book: "Hellenic Orders, Decorations and Medals", Athens 1991, by George J. Beldecos, © Hellenic War Museum

Saints Olga and Sophia
Saints Olga and Sophia, Order of
Awards established in 1936
1936 establishments in Greece
Saints Olga and Sophia